The Little Rissington UFO incident was an encounter in October 1952 between a Gloster Meteor and three unidentified saucer-shaped objects over Gloucestershire.

Position
RAF Little Rissington is a base to the west of the A424 in eastern Gloucestershire, east of Little Rissington in Cotswold District. From the 1940s, the base was the home of the Central Flying School. The eastern edge of the airfield meets the Oxfordshire boundary with Gloucestershire. The airfield is the point where the Gloucestershire boundary crosses the A424.

Encounter
On 21 October 1952 in the afternoon, Flt Lt (later Air Commodore) Michael Swiney and Lieutenant David Crofts, a Royal Navy pilot, took off from RAF Little Rissington in a Gloster Meteor VII (T.7), powered by two Rolls-Royce Derwent engines, on a training flight. At 12,000ft, they came through a layer of cloud to witness three white saucer-shaped objects, which they reported to be at 35,000ft. Initially the pilots had believed the saucer-shaped objects to be three parachutes. The pilots noted that the shape of the saucer shape was 'perfectly circular', and their Meteor aircraft climbed to 35,000ft.

Flt Lt Swiney reported the sighting of the three saucer objects to his Ground Control at RAF Sopley, and abruptly cancelled the training flight. Lt Crofts asked whether to pursue the three objects, but Flt Lt Swiney declined. The three objects crossed over the Meteor's path, from left to right (starboard). The objects remained on their starboard side. In a fraction of a second, the objects disappeared.

Radar reports
ATCC Gloucester (RAF Staverton, now Gloucestershire Airport next to junction 11 of the M5) confirmed the three objects that the pilots had seen. Two Meteor F.8 aircraft of RAF Fighter Command were scrambled to intercept the objects. The objects were heading east at 600 knots. The fighter aircraft did not make contact with the objects.

The RAF Southern Sector, based in Wiltshire, had detected three objects entering their airspace at 3,000mph.

Publicity
The incident was covered in the edition (Ep 1, Season 23) of Timewatch on BBC Two called Britain's X Files on 9 January 2004, directed by Michael Wadding and edited by John Farren. It was covered on Season 2 of UFO Files. Additionally, the incident is covered in Season 1, Episode 4 of UFO Europe: The Untold Stories.

See also
 Cotswold Air Show
 Reported UFO sightings in the United Kingdom

References

External links
 David Crofts
 Michael Swiney
 BFI

1952 in England
Alleged UFO-related aviation incidents
Cotswold District
Gloster Meteor
Gloucestershire folklore
Military history of Gloucestershire
UFO sightings in England
October 1952 events in the United Kingdom
20th century in Gloucestershire